Coleophora atlanti is a moth of the family Coleophoridae. It is found in the lower Volga area in southern Russia.

The larvae feed on Suaeda physophora.

References 

atlanti
Moths described in 2005
Moths of Europe